Grant's golden mole (Eremitalpa granti; colloquially also: dune shark) is a golden mole species. It is the only member of the genus Eremitalpa.

Attributes
Like all other golden moles, the build of these animals is similar to the moles, though they are not closely related, and are adapted to a life of digging. The front extremities are remodeled to digging claws; in contrast to most other species of its family, they have three claws each. The tail is physically not visible, there are no auricles, the eyes are covered with fur, and the mouth is bearing a leather-like pad, which also serves for digging.

Grant's golden moles have long silky fur, which is colored gray on cubs and sandy on older animals. With a length of 7.5 to 9 cm and a weight of 15 to 25 g it is the smallest member of its species.

Geographical distribution and habitat
Grant's golden mole lives on the western coast of South Africa and in south western Namibia. Its natural habitat is dry areas, mostly sandy deserts.

Diet and social behaviour
In contrast to many other golden moles, Grant's golden mole rarely builds lasting tunnels. It "swims" through the sand just under or on the surface while searching for food. It is mainly a nocturnal animal, resting by day in small caves beneath sheltering plants. It is a solitary animal, with stomping grounds averaging 4.6 ha. When foraging at night, the animal will alternate between moving over the surface sand, dipping its head into the substrate (detecting low frequency vibrations through the ground), and "swimming" through the sand. 

Besides termites (which constitute the majority of its food) and other invertebrates, its diet consists of reptiles such as skinks.

References

 Ronald M. Nowak: Walker's Mammals of the World. The Johns Hopkins University Press, Baltimore 1999, .

External links
 Grant's golden moles at Afrotheria Specialist Group, with pictures and link to maps of habitats

Afrosoricida
Myrmecophagous mammals
Mammals of Namibia
Mammals of South Africa
Least concern biota of Africa
Mammals described in 1907